Hypochthoniidae is a family of oribatids in the order Oribatida. There are at least 4 genera and 20 described species in Hypochthoniidae.

Genera
 Eohypochthonius Jacot, 1938
 Hypochthonius Koch, 1835
 Malacoangelia Berlese, 1913
 Nothrolohmannia Balogh, 1968

References

Further reading

 
 
 
 

Acariformes
Acari families